Mycale is a genus of demosponge with 240 recognised species in 11 subgenera. It has been a large genus with multiple subdivisions since it was first described in 1867.

Species 
The following species are recognized in the genus Mycale:

Subgenus Mycale (Aegogropila) Gray, 1867
Mycale (Aegogropila) adhaerens (Lambe, 1893)
Mycale (Aegogropila) americana van Soest, 1984
Mycale (Aegogropila) antiae Urgorri & Díaz-Agras, 2019
Mycale (Aegogropila) arndti van Soest, 1984
Mycale (Aegogropila) bamfieldensis Reiswig & Kaiser, 1989
Mycale (Aegogropila) carmigropila Hajdu & Rützler, 1998
Mycale (Aegogropila) cavernosa Bergquist, 1965
Mycale (Aegogropila) citrina Hajdu & Rützler, 1998
Mycale (Aegogropila) contarenii (Lieberkühn, 1859)
Mycale (Aegogropila) crassissima (Dendy, 1905)
Mycale (Aegogropila) denticulata Bertolino, Calcinai & Pansini, 2009
Mycale (Aegogropila) dickinsoni Carballo & Cruz-Barraza, 2010
Mycale (Aegogropila) dubia (Czerniavsky, 1880)
Mycale (Aegogropila) escarlatei Hajdu, Zea, Kielman & Peixinho, 1995
Mycale (Aegogropila) flagelliformis (Bergquist & Fromont, 1988)
Mycale (Aegogropila) furcata Calcinai, Bavestrello, Bertolino, Pica, Wagner & Cerrano, 2013
Mycale (Aegogropila) jukdoensis Kang & Sim, 2005
Mycale (Aegogropila) kolletae Carballo & Hajdu, 2001
Mycale (Aegogropila) lilianae Carballo & Hajdu, 1998
Mycale (Aegogropila) magellanica (Ridley, 1881)
Mycale (Aegogropila) magnitoxa Carballo & Cruz-Barraza, 2010
Mycale (Aegogropila) meridionalis Lévi, 1963
Mycale (Aegogropila) militaris Annandale, 1914
Mycale (Aegogropila) nodulosa Goodwin, Jones, Neely & Brickle, 2011
Mycale (Aegogropila) pachysigmata Pulitzer-Finali, 1996
Mycale (Aegogropila) parvasigma Hoshino, 1981
Mycale (Aegogropila) pellucida (Ridley, 1884)
Mycale (Aegogropila) phillipensis (Dendy, 1896)
Mycale (Aegogropila) plumosa sensu Hoshino, 1981
Mycale (Aegogropila) porosa (Ridley & Dendy, 1886)
Mycale (Aegogropila) retifera Topsent, 1924
Mycale (Aegogropila) rotalis (Bowerbank, 1874)
Mycale (Aegogropila) rubra Cedro, Hajdu & Correia, 2013
Mycale (Aegogropila) serpens (Lendenfeld, 1888)
Mycale (Aegogropila) simonis (Ridley & Dendy, 1886)
Mycale (Aegogropila) sulevoidea (Sollas, 1902)
Mycale (Aegogropila) syringosimilis Van Soest, Beglinger & De Voogd, 2014
Mycale (Aegogropila) syrinx (Schmidt, 1862)
Mycale (Aegogropila) tapetum Samaai & Gibbons, 2005
Mycale (Aegogropila) tenerifensis Van Soest, Beglinger & De Voogd, 2014
Mycale (Aegogropila) tunicata (Schmidt, 1862)
Subgenus Mycale (Anomomycale) Topsent, 1924
Mycale (Anomomycale) titubans (Schmidt, 1870)
Subgenus Mycale (Arenochalina) Lendenfeld, 1887
Mycale (Arenochalina) africamucosa Van Soest, Beglinger & De Voogd, 2014
Mycale (Arenochalina) anomala (Ridley & Dendy, 1886)
Mycale (Arenochalina) aplysilloides (Lendenfeld, 1888)
Mycale (Arenochalina) euplectellioides (Row, 1911)
Mycale (Arenochalina) flammula (Lamarck, 1814)
Mycale (Arenochalina) incrustans (Burton, 1932)
Mycale (Arenochalina) laxissima (Duchassaing & Michelotti, 1864)
Mycale (Arenochalina) mirabilis (Lendenfeld, 1887)
Mycale (Arenochalina) pluriloba (Lamarck, 1814)
Mycale (Arenochalina) setosa (Keller, 1889)
Mycale (Arenochalina) tenuityla (Pulitzer-Finali, 1982)
Mycale (Arenochalina) trincomaliensis Rao, 1941
Mycale (Arenochalina) truncatella (Lendenfeld, 1887)
Subgenus Mycale (Carmia) Gray, 1867
Mycale (Carmia) atropha Van Soest, Beglinger & De Voogd, 2014
Mycale (Carmia) babici (Laubenfels, 1936)
Mycale (Carmia) bolivari Ferrer-Hernandez, 1914
Mycale (Carmia) carlilei Lehnert, Stone & Heimler, 2006
Mycale (Carmia) cecilia Laubenfels, 1936
Mycale (Carmia) cockburniana Hentschel, 1911
Mycale (Carmia) confundata (de Laubenfels, 1954)
Mycale (Carmia) contax (Dickinson, 1945)
Mycale (Carmia) crassa (Dendy, 1896)
Mycale (Carmia) cucumis Koltun, 1958
Mycale (Carmia) digitata Bergquist & Tizard, 1967
Mycale (Carmia) diminuta Sarà, 1978
Mycale (Carmia) ernsthentscheli Van Soest & Hooper, 2020
Mycale (Carmia) erythraeana (Row, 1911)
Mycale (Carmia) fascibula (Topsent, 1904)
Mycale (Carmia) fibrexilis (Wilson, 1894)
Mycale (Carmia) fistulifera (Row, 1911)
Mycale (Carmia) fusiformis Lévi, 1960
Mycale (Carmia) gaussiana Hentschel, 1914
Mycale (Carmia) guineensis Van Soest, Beglinger & De Voogd, 2014
Mycale (Carmia) helios (Fristedt, 1887)
Mycale (Carmia) hentscheli (Bergquist & Fromont, 1988)
Mycale (Carmia) hispida (Lambe, 1893)
Mycale (Carmia) lissochela Bergquist, 1965
Mycale (Carmia) macilenta (Bowerbank, 1866)
Mycale (Carmia) magnirhaphidifera van Soest, 1984
Mycale (Carmia) micracanthoxea Buizer & van Soest, 1977
Mycale (Carmia) microsigmatosa Arndt, 1927
Mycale (Carmia) microxea Vacelet, Vasseur & Lévi, 1976
Mycale (Carmia) minima (Waller, 1880)
Mycale (Carmia) murrayi (Ridley & Dendy, 1886)
Mycale (Carmia) mytilorum Annandale, 1914
Mycale (Carmia) nullarosette Hoshino, 1981
Mycale (Carmia) orientalis (Topsent, 1897)
Mycale (Carmia) papillosa Koltun, 1959
Mycale (Carmia) phyllophila Hentschel, 1911
Mycale (Carmia) pulvinus Samaai & Gibbons, 2005
Mycale (Carmia) raphidiophora Hentschel, 1911
Mycale (Carmia) richardsoni Bakus, 1966
Mycale (Carmia) samaaii Van Soest & Hooper, 2020
Mycale (Carmia) sanguinea Tsurnamal, 1969
Mycale (Carmia) senegalensis Lévi, 1952
Mycale (Carmia) stegoderma (de Laubenfels, 1954)
Mycale (Carmia) subclavata (Bowerbank, 1866)
Mycale (Carmia) suezza (Row, 1911)
Mycale (Carmia) tasmani (Bergquist & Fromont, 1988)
Mycale (Carmia) tenuisinuousitylostyli Hoshino, 1981
Mycale (Carmia) tenuispiculata (Dendy, 1905)
Mycale (Carmia) toxifera (Dendy, 1896)
Mycale (Carmia) urizae Carballo & Hajdu, 1998
Subgenus Mycale (Grapelia) Gray, 1867
Mycale (Grapelia) ancorina (Whitelegge, 1906)
Mycale (Grapelia) australis (Gray, 1867)
Mycale (Grapelia) burtoni Hajdu, 1995
Mycale (Grapelia) carteri (Dendy & Frederick, 1924)
Mycale (Grapelia) menylloides Hajdu, 1995
Mycale (Grapelia) trichophora (Dendy & Frederick, 1924)
Mycale (Grapelia) unguifera Hajdu, Zea, Kielman & Peixinho, 1995
Mycale (Grapelia) vaceleti Hajdu, 1995
Mycale (Grapelia) vansoesti Hajdu, 1995
Subgenus Mycale (Mycale) Gray, 1867
Mycale (Mycale) alagoana Cedro, Hajdu & Correia, 2011
Mycale (Mycale) anisochela Lévi, 1963
Mycale (Mycale) arctica (Fristedt, 1887)
Mycale (Mycale) arenaria Hajdu & Desqueyroux-Faúndez, 1994
Mycale (Mycale) arenicola (Ridley & Dendy, 1886)
Mycale (Mycale) armata Thiele, 1903
Mycale (Mycale) aruensis Hentschel, 1912
Mycale (Mycale) beatrizae Hajdu & Desqueyroux-Faúndez, 1994
Mycale (Mycale) brownorum Goodwin, Brewin & Brickle, 2012
Mycale (Mycale) cartwrighti Goodwin, Brewin & Brickle, 2012
Mycale (Mycale) chujaensis Kang & Sim, 2005
Mycale (Mycale) darwini Hajdu & Desqueyroux-Faúndez, 1994
Mycale (Mycale) dendyi (Row, 1911)
Mycale (Mycale) doellojuradoi Burton, 1940
Mycale (Mycale) fibrosa Boury-Esnault & Van Beveren, 1982
Mycale (Mycale) fusca (Ridley & Dendy, 1886)
Mycale (Mycale) gelatinosa (Ridley, 1884)
Mycale (Mycale) geojensis Sim & Lee, 2001
Mycale (Mycale) grandis Gray, 1867
Mycale (Mycale) gravelyi Burton, 1937
Mycale (Mycale) immitis (Schmidt, 1870)
Mycale (Mycale) indica (Carter, 1887)
Mycale (Mycale) japonica Koltun, 1959
Mycale (Mycale) jasoniae Lehnert, Stone & Heimler, 2006
Mycale (Mycale) laevis (Carter, 1882)
Mycale (Mycale) lapidiformis (Ridley & Dendy, 1886)
Mycale (Mycale) lingua (Bowerbank, 1866)
Mycale (Mycale) longistyla Koltun, 1958
Mycale (Mycale) loveni (Fristedt, 1887)
Mycale (Mycale) macginitiei de Laubenfels, 1930
Mycale (Mycale) macrochela Burton, 1932
Mycale (Mycale) madraspatana Annandale, 1914
Mycale (Mycale) massa (Schmidt, 1862)
Mycale (Mycale) monanchorata Burton & Rao, 1932
Mycale (Mycale) myriasclera Lévi & Lévi, 1983
Mycale (Mycale) novaezealandiae Dendy, 1924
Mycale (Mycale) paschalis Desqueyroux-Faúndez, 1990
Mycale (Mycale) quadripartita Boury-Esnault, 1973
Mycale (Mycale) rara (Dendy, 1896)
Mycale (Mycale) rhaphidotoxa Hentschel, 1912
Mycale (Mycale) strongylophora (de Laubenfels, 1954)
Mycale (Mycale) sulcata Hentschel, 1911
Mycale (Mycale) thielei Hajdu & Desqueyroux-Faúndez, 1994
Mycale (Mycale) toporoki Koltun, 1958
Mycale (Mycale) topsenti Burton, 1959
Mycale (Mycale) trichela Lévi, 1963
Mycale (Mycale) tridens Hentschel, 1914
Mycale (Mycale) tylota Koltun, 1958
Subgenus Mycale (Naviculina) Gray, 1867
Mycale (Naviculina) arcuiris Lerner & Hajdu, 2002
Mycale (Naviculina) chungae Lerner & Hajdu, 2002
Mycale (Naviculina) cleistochela Vacelet & Vasseur, 1971
Mycale (Naviculina) cliftoni (Gray, 1867)
Mycale (Naviculina) cruzi Van Soest, Beglinger & De Voogd, 2014
Mycale (Naviculina) diastrophochela Lévi, 1969
Mycale (Naviculina) diversisigmata (van Soest, 1984)
Mycale (Naviculina) flagellifera Vacelet & Vasseur, 1971
Mycale (Naviculina) neunggulensis Sim & Kang, 2004
Mycale (Naviculina) obscura (Carter, 1882)
Mycale (Naviculina) peculiaris Pulitzer-Finali, 1996
Mycale (Naviculina) purpurata Lerner & Hajdu, 2002
Mycale (Naviculina) thaumatochela Lundbeck, 1905
Mycale (Naviculina) ulleungensis Sim & Kang, 2004
Subgenus Mycale (Oxymycale) Hentschel, 1929
Mycale (Oxymycale) acerata Kirkpatrick, 1907
Mycale (Oxymycale) intermedia (Schmidt, 1874)
Mycale (Oxymycale) klausjanusorum Van Soest, 2018
Mycale (Oxymycale) koreana (Sim, 1982)
Mycale (Oxymycale) paradoxa (de Laubenfels, 1935)
Mycale (Oxymycale) renieroides (Schmidt, 1870)
Mycale (Oxymycale) rhoi (Sim & Lee, 1998)
Mycale (Oxymycale) stecarmia (de Laubenfels, 1954)
Mycale (Oxymycale) stephensae Samaai & Gibbons, 2005
Mycale (Oxymycale) tylotornota Koltun, 1964
Subgenus Mycale (Paresperella) Dendy, 1905
Mycale (Paresperella) atlantica Stephens, 1917
Mycale (Paresperella) bidentata (Dendy, 1905)
Mycale (Paresperella) claudei Van Soest & Hooper, 2020
Mycale (Paresperella) curvisigma (Lévi, 1969)
Mycale (Paresperella) dentata Sarà, 1958
Mycale (Paresperella) dichela (Hentschel, 1911)
Mycale (Paresperella) janvermeuleni Van Soest, Beglinger & De Voogd, 2014
Mycale (Paresperella) levii (Uriz, 1987)
Mycale (Paresperella) macrosigma (Lindgren, 1897)
Mycale (Paresperella) microsigma (Bergquist & Fromont, 1988)
Mycale (Paresperella) moluccensis (Thiele, 1903)
Mycale (Paresperella) penicillium (Lendenfeld, 1888)
Mycale (Paresperella) psila (de Laubenfels, 1930)
Mycale (Paresperella) repens (Whitelegge, 1907)
Mycale (Paresperella) serratohamata (Carter, 1880)
Mycale (Paresperella) serrulata Sarà & Siribelli, 1960
Mycale (Paresperella) spinosigma (Boury-Esnault, 1973)
Mycale (Paresperella) undulata (Tanita, 1968)
Mycale (Paresperella) vitellina van Soest, 2009
Subgenus Mycale (Rhaphidotheca) Kent, 1870
Mycale (Rhaphidotheca) coronata (Dendy, 1926)
Mycale (Rhaphidotheca) ernsti Van Soest & Hooper, 2020
Mycale (Rhaphidotheca) loricata (Topsent, 1896)
Mycale (Rhaphidotheca) marshallhalli (Kent, 1870)
Mycale (Rhaphidotheca) verdensis Van Soest, Beglinger & De Voogd, 2014
Subgenus Mycale (Zygomycale) Topsent, 1930
Mycale (Zygomycale) angulosa (Duchassaing & Michelotti, 1864)
Mycale (Zygomycale) parishii (Bowerbank, 1875)
Mycale (Zygomycale) pectinicola Hentschel, 1911
Mycale (Zygomycale) ramulosa Carballo & Cruz-Barrazo, 2010
Mycale (Zygomycale) sierraleonensis Van Soest, Beglinger & De Voogd, 2014
Subgenus unassigned
Mycale corrugata (Bowerbank, 1866)
Mycale cylindrica (Whitelegge, 1906)
Mycale diaphana (Schmidt, 1870)
Mycale humilis (Thiele, 1903)
Mycale imperfecta Baer, 1906
Mycale incurvata Lévi, 1993
Mycale izuensis Tanita & Hoshino, 1989
Mycale jophon (Swartschewsky, 1905)
Mycale lindbergi Koltun, 1958
Mycale mammiformis (Ridley & Dendy, 1886)
Mycale mannarensis Thomas, 1968
Mycale multisclera Pulitzer-Finali, 1993
Mycale ochotensis Koltun, 1959
Mycale pluma (Lamarck, 1814)
Mycale profunda Koltun, 1964
Mycale radiosa (Bowerbank, 1876)
Mycale relicta Annandale, 1924
Mycale tenuis Sarà, 1978
Mycale textilis (Whitelegge, 1906)
Mycale vermistyla Li, 1986
Mycale waitei (Whitelegge, 1906)

References

Poecilosclerida